The 1999–2000 UNC Wilmington Seahawks men's basketball team represented the University of North Carolina Wilmington during the 1999–2000 NCAA Division I men's basketball season. The Seahawks, led by sixth-year head coach Jerry Wainwright, played their home games at the Trask Coliseum and were members of the Colonial Athletic Association (CAA).

After finishing fourth place in the CAA regular season standings, the Seahawks won the CAA tournament to receive an automatic bid to the NCAA tournament – the first appearance in school history – as No. 15 seed in the South region. UNC Wilmington lost to No. 2 seed Cincinnati in the opening round.

Roster

Schedule and results

|-
!colspan=9 style=| Regular season

|-
!colspan=9 style=| CAA tournament

|-
!colspan=9 style=| NCAA tournament

Awards and honors
Brett Blizzard – CAA tournament MVP

References

UNC Wilmington Seahawks men's basketball seasons
Unc Wilmington
Unc Wilmington